The 2013 Greensboro mayoral election was held on November 5, 2013 to elect the mayor of Greensboro, North Carolina. It saw the election of Nancy Vaughan, who unseated incumbent mayor Robbie Perkins.

Results

Primary 
The date of the primary was October 8.

General election

References 

Greensboro
Mayoral elections in Greensboro, North Carolina
Greensboro